The 2023 NBA playoffs is the upcoming postseason tournament of the National Basketball Association's 2022–23 season. The playoffs will begin on April 15 and will end with the conclusion of the 2023 NBA Finals.

Overview

Notable updates to postseason appearances
The Milwaukee Bucks will enter the postseason for the seventh consecutive season.
The Denver Nuggets will enter the postseason for the fifth consecutive season.
The Boston Celtics will enter the postseason for the ninth consecutive season, currently the longest such streak in the NBA.

Format

Eight teams from each conference participated in the playoffs. The top six teams in each conference, based on winning percentage, directly qualified for the playoffs; the seeding order of those teams was also based on winning percentage. If two or more teams had the same record, standard NBA tiebreaker rules were used.

The NBA Board of Governors adopted a format to have a play-in tournament involving the teams ranked 7th through 10th in each conference. The 7th place team and 8th place team participated in a "double-chance" game, with the winner advancing to the playoffs as the 7-seed. The loser then played the winner of the elimination game between the 9th place and 10th place teams to determine the playoff's 8-seed. The NBA's regular playoff format then proceeded as normal.

Each conference's bracket was fixed with no reseeding. All rounds were best-of-seven series; a series ended when one team won four games, and that team advanced to the next round. All rounds, including the NBA Finals, were in a 2–2–1–1–1 format with regards to hosting. In the conference playoffs, home court advantage went to the higher-seeded team (number one being the highest). Conference seedings were ignored for the NBA Finals: home court advantage went to the team with the better regular season record, and, if needed, ties were broken based on head-to-head record, followed by intra-conference record.

Playoff qualifying
On March 14, 2023, the Milwaukee Bucks became the first team to clinch a playoff spot.

The below tables reflect current playoff positioning and are subject to change through the end of the regular season (April 9). Seeds 7 and 8 in each conference are not finalized until the first-stage play-in tournament is completed (April 11–14).

Eastern Conference
Updated as of March 19, 2023.

 Teams ranked 7 through 10 will participate in the play-in tournament to determine seeds 7 and 8.

Western Conference

 Teams ranked 7 through 10 will participate in the play-in tournament to determine seeds 7 and 8.

Media coverage

Television
ESPN, ABC, TNT, and NBA TV will broadcast the playoffs nationally in the United States.

ESPN/ABC will have exclusive coverage of the Western Conference Finals while TNT will exclusive coverage of the Eastern Conference Finals. ABC will have exclusive coverage of the NBA Finals for the 21st straight year.

References

External links

Basketball – Reference.com's 2023 Playoffs section

Playoffs
National Basketball Association playoffs